Almond Thomas Richards (3 April 1911 – 27 November 1992) was an Australian rules footballer who played for the Essendon Football Club in the Victorian Football League (VFL).

Recruited from Eaglehawk Football Club in the Bendigo Football League.

Notes

External links 
		

1911 births
1992 deaths
Australian rules footballers from Victoria (Australia)
Essendon Football Club players